Kim Ji-won (Hangul: 김지원, Hanja: 金知元; born 6 August 1959 in Seoul) is a former South Korean boxer who was an unbeaten world champion in the super bantamweight division. He is one of just fifteen world boxing champions to retire without a loss.

Amateur career
Kim began garnering attention in 1978 when he won the flyweight (-51 kg) gold medal at the Asian Junior Amateur Boxing Championships in Karachi, Pakistan.

In 1979, Kim won the gold medal in the flyweight division at the CISM Amateur Boxing Championships in Caracas, Venezuela, beating Oudahi Mohammad Amin of Algeria via first-round knockout in the final bout.

In February 1980, Kim participated in the Asian Amateur Boxing Championships held in Bombay, India. There he captured the gold medal in the flyweight division. In April 1980, Kim won the flyweight gold medal at the King's Cup Boxing, beating future World Amateur Boxing Championship bronze medalist Constantin Titoiu of Romania in the final bout.

In 1981, Kim won the bantamweight gold medal at the King's Cup Boxing, defeating future Commonwealth Games gold medalist Hussein Khalili of Kenya in the final.

Pro career
On 17 May 1983 the southpaw defeated Chun Chan-jung for the Korean super bantamweight title. Four months later he fought Little Bangoyan for the vacant Oriental and Pacific Boxing Federation (OPBF) title, capturing it with a twelve-round decision. For the next year Kim made five defenses of his OPBF title against the likes of Lito Cortez (KO 2), Rolando Navarro (PTS 12), and Fel Malatag (TKO 6).

On 3 January 1985, he fought countryman and reigning International Boxing Federation super bantamweight champion Suh Sung-in. Kim won via a tenth round stoppage. Kim would make four successful defenses of his title against future WBO featherweight champion Ruben Dario Palacios (W15, 30 March 1985), former IBF super bantamweight champions Bobby Berna (KO 4, 28 June 1985) and Suh Sung-in (KO 1, 9 October 1985), and Rudy Casicas (KO 2, 2 May 1986).

In December 1986, he retired from boxing in order to become a theatrical actor and singer, finishing with a record of 16 wins, no losses, and two draws, both draws coming from the same boxer. He would become one of the few world champions to retire undefeated.

Personal life
Kim has one sister, Ji-Sook, the Grand Bell Award winning actress, and one brother, Ji-Woon who is a world-acclaimed filmmaker.

Professional boxing record

References

1959 births
Super-bantamweight boxers
Living people
World super-bantamweight boxing champions
International Boxing Federation champions
Undefeated world boxing champions
South Korean male boxers